Axis Tower may refer to

Axis Tower, a building in Manchester, England  
Axis Tower Development, a building under construction in Cape Town, 
Axis Towers, a building in Tbilisi, Georgia